Iorwerth Rhys Thomas (22 January 1895 – 3 December 1966) was a Welsh Labour Party politician.

Thomas was born on 22 January 1895, the son of David William Thomas, a self-employed greengrocer of  Cwmparc, Rhondda. He was educated at a local elementary school, and in 1908, at 13 years of age, he began working at the Dare Colliery, Cwmparc. He attended evening classes in economics and history in order to improve his education, and in 1918 he joined the Labour Party.

In 1922 he was promoted to the position of checkweighman at Cwm-parc. He was a prominent figure within the South Wales Miners' Federation and the National Union of Mineworkers for more than 30 years and held a number of offices in the Park and Dare Lodge, the largest in the south Wales coalfield. During the 1926 coalminers' strike Thomas was sentenced to three months imprisonment as the chairman of the Park and Dare Lodge as a result of his involvement in industrial disturbances.

He was elected a member of the Rhondda Borough Council in 1928, chaired many of its committees and served as its chairman in 1938–39. He remained a member until 1951. He served, too, on a number of joint industrial councils for Wales and Monmouthshire, and was a member of the South Wales Electricity Board, 1947–49.

In 1950 he was elected for Rhondda West and continued to represent the constituency until his death in 1966. He was much interested in economic and industrial matters. Thomas was a consistent opponent of Welsh nationalism and fought relentlessly against the Parliament for Wales agitation of the 1950s. He publicly attacked Plaid Cymru on several occasions and in October 1965 he was highly critical of the recommendations of the Hughes-Parry Report on the Legal Status of the Welsh Language. In 1960 he supported the Conservative government's measure to open public houses on Sundays.

He married in October 1920 Annie Mary, daughter of D.J. Davies. She, too, was active in the Labour politics of the area. She died in July 1956. They had one son and one daughter. Thomas died on 3 December 1966 aged 81 at his home 94 Park Road, Cwmparc, Rhondda.

References
British Parliamentary by-elections, 1967: Rhondda West
UK General Elections since 1832

External links 
 

1895 births
1966 deaths
National Union of Mineworkers-sponsored MPs
Welsh Labour Party MPs
UK MPs 1950–1951
UK MPs 1951–1955
UK MPs 1955–1959
UK MPs 1959–1964
UK MPs 1964–1966
UK MPs 1966–1970
People from Treorchy